Filippo Volandri won the inaugural edition of Due Ponti Cup. He defeated Reda El Amrani 6–3, 6–2 in the final.

Seeds

Draw

Finals

Top half

Bottom half

References
Main Draw
Qualifying Singles

Due Ponti Cup - Singles